Clare Ada Rustad (born May 27, 1983) is a Canadian former soccer midfielder. Her last club was the Toronto Lady Lynx in 2010. She played for Canada women's national soccer team between 2000 and 2008, making 45 appearances and scoring three goals.

Playing career

Club
Rustad played collegiate soccer for the University of Washington between 2001 and 2004, and professionally for Vancouver Whitecaps FC. She is a distinguished alumnus of Gordon Head Soccer Association.

International
Rustad competed for the Canada national under-19 soccer team at the 2002 FIFA U-19 Women's World Championship, winning the silver medal. She made her international debut for Canada on June 26, 2000 against China in the 2000 CONCACAF Women's Gold Cup. She last represented Canada at the 2008 Olympics in Beijing, retiring from international football afterwards.

Broadcasting career
Rustad has served as a soccer analyst on CBC, TSN and Sportsnet for events including the Pan Am Games, the FIFA Women's World Cup, and the 2020 Tokyo Olympics.

Personal life
Rustad grew up on Saltspring Island in British Columbia. She began medical school at the University of Toronto in 2008 and graduated in 2012. She has a molecular biology degree from the University of Washington and a master's degree in epidemiology from the University of Cambridge. Dr. Rustad is currently a resident in Family Medicine in Ontario. In March 2013, Rustad joined the National Organizing Committee for the 2015 FIFA Women's World Cup held in Canada.

References

External links
 
 
 Gordon Head Soccer Association
 Washington Huskies Profile

1983 births
Living people
Soccer people from British Columbia
Canadian expatriate sportspeople in the United States
Canadian expatriate women's soccer players
Canadian women's soccer players
Canada women's international soccer players
People from North Vancouver
University of Washington alumni
Footballers at the 2008 Summer Olympics
Olympic soccer players of Canada
Washington Huskies women's soccer players
USL W-League (1995–2015) players
Vancouver Whitecaps FC (women) players
Women's association football defenders
Women's association football midfielders
Toronto Lady Lynx players
Expatriate women's soccer players in the United States